Zinetula Khaidarovich "Bill" Bilyaletdinov (born 13 March 1955) is a former Russian ice hockey player of Tatar descent, who played for the USSR.

From 1973–1988 Bilyaletdinov played for HC Dynamo Moscow. As a coach, he won the Russian Championship in the 2005–2006 season and the 2007 European Champions Cup, as well as the first-ever KHL Gagarin Cup championship as coaching Ak Bars Kazan.

Bilyaletdinov served as an assistant coach for the Winnipeg Jets in the 1994 and 1995 seasons, and as an assistant coach for the Phoenix Coyotes during the 1996–1997 season.

In June 2011, Bilyaletdinov was appointed to head coach of the Russian national ice hockey team. As the head coach of the national team, Bilyaletdinov has emphasised defensive discipline.

In 2012, Russia won the 2012 IIHF World Championship in Helsinki. Russia won all its matches of the tournament in regulation time, the first time any team had done so since the Soviet Union in 1989. After the tournament, star player Alexander Semin praised Bilyaletdinov's disciplined approach and focus on retaining possession of the puck. He was fired after Russia men's national ice hockey team was eliminated in the quarterfinals at the 2014 Winter Olympics.

Personal life
His grandson Alexander Romanov is a defenceman for the New York Islanders.

Career statistics

Regular season

International

References

External links

 
  Profile at the website of HC Dynamo Moscow

1955 births
Arizona Coyotes coaches
Dynamo sports society athletes
HC Dynamo Moscow players
Honoured Coaches of Russia
Ice hockey players at the 1980 Winter Olympics
Ice hockey players at the 1984 Winter Olympics
Living people
Medalists at the 1980 Winter Olympics
Medalists at the 1984 Winter Olympics
Olympic gold medalists for the Soviet Union
Olympic ice hockey players of the Soviet Union
Olympic medalists in ice hockey
Olympic silver medalists for the Soviet Union
Recipients of the Order "For Merit to the Fatherland", 4th class
Russia men's national ice hockey team coaches
Russian ice hockey coaches
Soviet ice hockey defencemen
Ice hockey people from Moscow
Tatar people of Russia
Tatar sportspeople
Winnipeg Jets (1972–1996) coaches
Ice hockey coaches at the 2014 Winter Olympics